Hans Ingvald Hansen Ratvik (27 January 1883 – 6 June 1966) was a Norwegian politician for the Liberal Party.

He was born in Borgund, Møre og Romsdal.

He was elected to the Norwegian Parliament from Møre og Romsdal in 1945, but was not re-elected in 1949. He had previously served in the position of deputy representative during the term 1937–1945.

Ratvik was a member of Borgund municipality council from 1913 to 1919, and then served as mayor in 1919–1922, 1937–1940 and 1945 as well as deputy mayor during the terms 1931–1934 and 1934–1937.

References

1883 births
1966 deaths
Liberal Party (Norway) politicians
Members of the Storting
20th-century Norwegian politicians